The 1907 Kentucky Derby was the 33rd running of the Kentucky Derby. The race took place on May 6, 1907 over a muddy track. The field was reduced to six competitors when Arcite and Boxara scratched.

Full results

Winning Breeder: J. Hal Woodford; (KY)

Payout
 The winner received a purse of $4,850.
 Second place received $700.
 Third place received $300.

References

1907
Kentucky Derby
Derby
May 1907 sports events
1907 in American sports